Celeste Kidd is a professor of psychology at the University of California, Berkeley. She was amongst the "Silence Breakers" who were named Time Person of the Year in 2017.

Early life and education 
Kidd studied print journalism and linguistics at the University of Southern California, where she earned a dual honors degree in 2007. Kidd moved to the University of Rochester for her graduate studies, where she worked in brain and cognitive studies and earned her PhD in 2013. She worked with Richard N. Aslin, an expert on infant learning. Kidd held visiting positions at Stanford University and the Massachusetts Institute of Technology.

Research and career 
Kidd works on curiosity and exploration throughout early development. She was hired as assistant professor at the University of Rochester in 2012. She has studied the willpower of children, challenging the Stanford marshmallow experiment. She demonstrated that children's willpower is influenced by their superior's reliability and trust.

Kidd was made director of the Rochester Baby Lab at the University of Rochester in 2014. She moved to the University of California, Berkeley, in June 2018. She has studied why it is so difficult to shake a false belief, such as believing in flat earth or climate change denial. Kidd is interested in the neuroscience of curiosity. She demonstrated that uncertainty can lead to the most curiosity.

#MeToo advocacy 

In 2016, Kidd reported sexual harassment by T. Florian Jaeger, then (and today) a tenured professor at the University of Rochester. The university closed the investigation before it reviewed relevant evidence or spoke to witnesses Kidd named who could corroborate her claims. Kidd then became one of eight then current and former faculty members at the University of Rochester to file a complaint with the Equal Employment Opportunity Commission that included statements and evidence from 11 women who experienced the tenured professor's sexual harassment at the University of Rochester. In response, the university paid $4.5 million for an outside investigation led by Mary Jo White which confirmed all substantial allegations about the tenured professor, but suggested that they did not meet the threshold for illegal sexual harassment or retaliation.

Kidd was one of nine students and faculty members who became plaintiffs in a lawsuit against the university for discrimination and retaliation relating to the allegations of sexual misconduct. In 2020, a federal court disagreed with the conclusions of the Mary Jo White Report and upheld 16 of the 17 claims alleged by the plaintiffs. The university then settled with Kidd and the other plaintiffs for $9.4 million and issued a statement thanking the plaintiffs for bringing their concerns forward.

Kidd left the University of Rochester in 2018. She has since become a campaigner to end sexual harassment in academia. Kidd was made a leader in the Me Too movement in academia, and one of several advocates selected as Time Person of the Year. She has criticized how universities are expected to "investigate themselves" when it comes to complaints about sexual harassment. She believes that public pressure and increased transparency will help to transform academia.

Awards and honors 
 2012 Discover magazine Top 100 Science Story of 2012
 2014 Cognitive Science Society Glushko Dissertation Prize in Cognitive Science
 2017 Time Person of the Year

Kidd has been selected as one of the Association for Psychological Science's Rising Stars.

References 

Living people
American women psychologists
21st-century American psychologists
University of Rochester alumni
University of Rochester faculty
University of California, Berkeley alumni
University of Southern California alumni
Year of birth missing (living people)
American women academics
21st-century American women